On Writing may refer to:

 On Writing: A Memoir of the Craft, a memoir by American author Stephen King
 "On Writing", a story fragment by American writer Ernest Hemingway
 Stein on Writing, advice for writers by American writer Sol Stein